A list of films produced in the Soviet Union in 1927 (see 1927 in film).

1927

See also
 1927 in the Soviet Union

External links
 Soviet films of 1927 at the Internet Movie Database

1927
Soviet
Films